Armstrong is an unincorporated community located in the town of Osceola, Fond du Lac County, Wisconsin, United States. It was settled in 1851 and a post office was opened in 1862.

Notes

Unincorporated communities in Fond du Lac County, Wisconsin
Unincorporated communities in Wisconsin